Sylwester Chęciński (21 May 1930, Skwarki – 8 December 2021, Wrocław) was a Polish film and television director. He was born in Susiec, Poland, on 21 May 1930. Chęciński died in Wrocław on 8 December 2021, at the age of 91.

Biography 
Chęciński was born 21 May 1930 in Skwarki. In 1950, he graduated from the 1st Secondary School of General Education named after Jędrzej Śniadeckiego in Dzierżoniów, and in 1956 the Directing Department of the State Film School in Łódź.

He is best known for the trilogy Sami swoi, Nie ma mocnych and Kochaj albo rzuć. He directed his first film Historia żółtej ciżemki in 1961. In the years 1976–1980 he was the deputy artistic director of the film group "Iluzjon", and in the years 1988–1991 the deputy artistic director of the film group "Kadr". For lifetime achievement, he received "Platinum Lions" at the 39th Gdynia Film Festival (2014) and the Polish Academy Life Achievement Award (2017).

Chęciński died on December 8, 2021. On December 18, after the mass in the Cathedral of St. John the Baptist in Wrocław was buried at the Grabiszyński Cemetery in Wrocław.

Selected filmography
 1961: Historia żółtej ciżemki
 1964: Agnieszka 46
 1965: Katastrofa
 1967: Sami swoi
 1969: Tylko umarły odpowie
 1970: Legenda
 1971: Diament radży
 1971: Pierwsza miłość
 1973: Droga
 1974: Nie ma mocnych
 1977: Kochaj albo rzuć
 1978: Roman i Magda
 1980: Bo oszalałem dla niej
 1982: Wielki Szu
 1991: Calls Controlled
 2006: Przybyli ułani

References

External links
 Sylwester Chęciński at the Filmpolski Database 
 Sylwester Chęciński laureatem Platynowych Lwów at the Film.onet.pl 
 

1930 births
2021 deaths
Polish film directors
Polish screenwriters
People from Dzierżoniów
People from Tomaszów Lubelski County
Łódź Film School alumni
Recipients of the Order of Polonia Restituta
Recipients of the Medal of the Commission for National Education
Recipients of the Gold Medal for Merit to Culture – Gloria Artis